Neotogaria hoenei is a moth in the family Drepanidae. It is found in China (Guangdong, Yunnan) and Thailand.

References

Moths described in 1941
Thyatirinae
Moths of Asia